Françoise Dorner (born 17 June 1949, Paris) is a French actress, screenwriter, author of plays and novels.

Biography

Actress 
Dorner appeared for the first time in the cinema thanks to Éric Le Hung who entrusted her in 1975 one of the main roles of Raging Fists along , Marie-Georges Pascal and Tony Gatlif, also author of the script. She can be seen in 1981 in Haute surveillance by  then in 1984 next to Pierre Richard in The twin. 

Although her film career remains quite modest, Françoise Dorner, has been very present on the small screen since the late 1960s. She was the star of several TV movies and embodied in particular La Petite Fadette in 1978. In 1985, she interpreted the commissioner Françoise Valence in the series "Madame et ses flics". The television also gave her in 1996, the possibility of adapting one of her plays, Le Parfum de Jeannette.

Writer 
Her plays L'Hirondelle and Le Parfum de Jeannette, cowritten with Jean-Claude Carrière, earned her the Prix du Jeune Théâtre Béatrix Dussane-André Roussin. In 2006 La Douceur assassine obtained the Prix Émile Augier bestowed by the Académie française and in 2011, she received the Prix Roger-Nimier for Tartelettes, jarretelles et bigorneaux.

Works

PLays 
 L'Hirondelle
 Le Parfum de Jeannette
 Bonheur Parfait (2000)

Novels 
 2004: La Fille du rang derrière (Albin Michel, Le Livre de Poche 2006)
 2006: La Douceur assassine (Albin Michel, Le Livre de Poche, 2008) adapted to the cinema under the title Mr. Morgan's Last Love (2013) directed by Sandra Nettelbeck
 2009: Magic Retouches (Albin Michel)
 2011: Tartelettes, jarretelles et bigorneaux (Albin Michel)

Theatre 
 1967: Le Duel by Anton Chekhov, directed by André Barsacq, Théâtre de l'Atelier
 1975: Des journées entières dans les arbres by Marguerite Duras, directed by Jean-Louis Barrault, Théâtre d'Orsay : 
 1980: Diderot à corps perdu, directed by Jean-Louis Barrault, Théâtre d'Orsay : Mademoiselle de Lespinasse
 1981: Madame est sortie by Pascal Jardin, directed by Pierre Boutron, tournée Herbert-Karsenty
 1987: Le Nègre by Didier van Cauwelaert, directed by Pierre Boutron, tournée Herbert-Karsenty
 1988: Avanti ! by Samuel A. Taylor, directed by Pierre Mondy, Théâtre du Palais-Royal : Diana Claiborn
 1991: Ornifle ou le Courant d'air by Jean Anouilh, directed by Patrice Leconte, Théâtre des Bouffes Parisiens :

Filmography

Actress 
Cinema
 1975: Raging Fists, by Éric Le Hung: BB la brune 
 1975: Émilienne, by Guy Casaril: Diane
 1975: Flic Story, by Jacques Deray:  Suzanne Bollec 
 1978: En l'autre bord, by : une mère
 1981: Haute surveillance, by Pierre-Alain Jolivet: Claire Mazarine 
 1984: Le Jumeau, by Yves Robert: Marie 
 1985: Gros Dégueulasse, by : la fille aux boucles d'oreilles 
 1989: L'invité surprise, by Georges Lautner: Julie
 1990: Feu sur le candidat, by : Marie-Diane 
 1992: Les amies de ma femme, by Didier Van Cauwelaert: Hélène

Télévision
 1966: L'affaire Lemoine, episode of the series En votre âme et conscience by Claude Barma: Angélina Lemoine 
 1967: Les Cinq Dernières Minutes Voies de fait by Jean-Pierre Decourt 
 1967: Le Somnambule, episode of the series L'amateur ou S.O.S. Fernand by Jean-Pierre Decourt: Denise
 1967: Le Fabuleux Grimoire de Nicolas Flamel, episode of the series Le Tribunal de l'impossible by Guy Lessertisseur: Jeanneton 
 1969: L'Auberge de Peyrebeilles, episode of the series  En votre âme et conscience by Guy Lessertisseur: Angélina Lemoine 
 1969: Le Petit Monde de Marie-Plaisance, série télévisée by André Pergament: Christine  
 1971: La Mort des capucines, téléfilm by Agnès Delarive: Arielle  
 1971: La Possédée, téléfilm by Éric Le Hung: Sœur Calixte 
 1972: Les Mal-Aimés, téléfilm by Pierre Vallet:  Marianne de Virelade
 1972: Das Mädchen aus Bourgneuf and Strauchritter auf der Messerstraße, two épisodes of the series Die Melchiors by Hermann Leitner : Lucienn
 1973: Le Temps de vivre, le temps d'aimer, mini série by Éric Le Hung : Catherine
 1974: Les Enfants des autres, série télévisée by Louis Grospierre : Lise 
 1974: Amoureuse Joséphine, téléfilm by Guy Lessertisseur: Laure Junot
 1974: Le Soleil de Palicorna, téléfilm by Philippe Jouillat: Sandra
 1975: Les Exilés, téléfilm by Guy Lessertisseur : Béatrice
 1976: La Pêche miraculeuse, mini série by Pierre Matteuzzi: Antoinette Galland
 1978: La Petite Fadette, téléfilm by Lazare Iglesis : Fadette
 1979: Miss et la vie en rose, episode of the series Miss : Sabine 
 1979: Crapotte, episode of the series Les Amours de la Belle Époque by Agnès Delarive : Crapotte
 1979: La Belle vie, by Jean Anouilh directec by Lazare Iglesis : La femme de chambre 
 1980: Lundi, episode of the series Cinéma 16 by Edmond Séchan : Mme Martin 
 1981: L'Antichambre, by Hervé Bromberger : Wanda 
 1981: Le Bouffon, by Guy Jorré : Françoise 
 1982: Je tue il, episode of the series Cinéma 16 by Pierre Boutron : Mlle Trinquier 
 1982: L'Accompagnateur, téléfilm by Pierre Boutron : Mme Guimont-Villiers 
 1982: La Marseillaise, téléfilm by Michel Berny : Isabelle 
 1983: Fabien de la Drôme, série télévisée by Michel Wyn : Julie 
 1983: Quelques hommes de bonne volonté, mini série by François Villiers : Mathilde 
 1983: Les Enquêtes du commissaire Maigret, épisode : Un Noël de Maigret by Jean-Paul Sassy : Mme Martin 
 1984: La Jeune Femme en vert, by Lazare Iglesis : Flore 
 1985: Madame et ses flics, série télévisée : Le commissaire Françoise Valence 
 1989: Le Nègre, by Yves-André Hubert : Clémentine 
 1990: Avanti, téléfilm by Patrick Bureau : Diana Claiborn 
 1994: L'Homme de mes rêves, téléfilm by Georges Lautner : Guillemette Deslandes 
 1995: L'Affaire Dreyfus, téléfilm by Yves Boisset : Berthe 
 1995: Les Grandes Personnes, téléfilm by Daniel Moosmann : la gynécologue
 1995: La Duchesse de Langeais, téléfilm by Jean-Daniel Verhaeghe : 
 1996: Le Parfum de Jeannette, téléfilm by Jean-Daniel Verhaeghe : Jeanette 
 1997: Le Président et la garde barrière, téléfilm by Jean-Dominique de la Rochefoucauld : Madame Deschanel
 1998: Les Pédiatres, mini série by Hartmut Griesmayr and Daniel Losset :
 2003: La Faux, téléfilm by Jean-Dominique de la Rochefoucauld : Agnès 
 2004: Enfance volée, episode of the series La Crim' : Mme Filipani

Screenwriter 
 1997: Une Femme sur mesure TV movie by Detlef Rönfeldt, cowritten with Marianne Sägebrecht.
 1999: La Secrétaire du Père Noël, directed by Dagmar Damek
 2012: Mr. Morgan's Last Love , cowritten and directed by Sandra Nettelbeck, adaptation of Françoise Dorner's novel La Douceur assassine

Dubbing 
 1973: Aminata by 
 1978: Goin' South: Julia Tate Moon (Mary Steenburgen)
 1981: Halloween II: Karen Bailey (Pamela Susan Shoop)
 1983: Scarface: Elvira Hancock (Michelle Pfeiffer)
 1983: Trading Places: Penelope Witherspoon (Kristin Holby)
 1984: Police Academy: Sgt Debbie Callahan (Leslie Easterbrook)

External links 
 Françoise Dorner on Allociné
 Françoise Dorner on the site of the Académie française
 La dDuceur assassine on Critiques Libres

1949 births
Writers from Paris
Actresses from Paris
French stage actresses
French film actresses
French women screenwriters
French screenwriters
21st-century French non-fiction writers
20th-century French dramatists and playwrights
21st-century French dramatists and playwrights
Prix Goncourt du Premier Roman recipients
Roger Nimier Prize winners
Living people
21st-century French women writers
20th-century French women writers